Governor Eliot, Elliot, or Elliott may refer to:

Andrew Elliot (1728–1797), 41st Governor of New York in 1783
Charles Elliot (1801–1875), Governor of Bermuda from 1846 to 1854, Governor of Trinidad from 1854 to 1856, and Governor of Saint Helena from 1863 to 1869
Charles Eliot (diplomat) (1862–1931), Governor of Kenya from 1900 to 1904
George Augustus Eliott, 1st Baron Heathfield (1717–1790), Governor of Londonderry from 1774 to 1775 and Governor of Gibraltar from 1777 to 1790
Hugh Elliot (1752–1830), Governor of the Leeward Islands from 1809 to 1814 and Governor of Madras from 1814 to 1820
John Eliot (Royal Navy officer) (1742–1769), 5th Governor of British West Florida in 1769
John Elliot (Royal Navy officer) (1732–1808), Governor of Newfoundland from 1786 to 1789
John C. Elliott (1919–2001), Governor of American Samoa in 1952
Roger Elliott (1665–1714), Governor of Gibraltar from 1707 to 1711